Sergey Betov and Alexander Bury were the defending champions, but decided not to compete together. Bury played alongside Teymuraz Gabashvili, but lost to Yaraslav Shyla and Andrei Vasilevski in the first round. Betov competed with Mikhail Elgin and reached the final, but lost to Yuki Bhambri and Adrián Menéndez-Maceiras, 7–5, 3–6, [8–10].

Seeds

Draw

References
 Main Draw

Karshi Challenger - Doubles
2015 Doubles